Sir George Hamilton of Greenlaw and Roscrea (died before 1657) was an undertaker in the Plantation of Ulster. Born and bred in Scotland, by 1611 he had moved to Ireland with his Scottish wife to occupy his plantation grant. In 1630 he married his second wife and moved to Roscrea in southern Ireland, which his father-in-law, Walter Butler, 11th Earl of Ormond, leased to him in lieu of dowry.

Thomas Carte (1736) in his Life of James Duke of Ormonde confused Hamilton with his nephew Sir George Hamilton, 1st Baronet of Donalong, leading to the belief that Mary Hamilton, the duke's sister and mother of Antoine Hamilton, the author of the Mémoires du Comte de Grammont, stayed at Roscrea when it was captured by Owen Roe O'Neill in 1646 during the Irish Confederate Wars.

Birth and origins 

George was born between 1575 and 1590, probably at Paisley, Scotland, the fourth son of Claud Hamilton and his wife Margaret Seton. His father was on 24 July 1587 created Lord Paisley. His paternal grandfather (died 1575) had been James Hamilton, 2nd Earl of Arran in Scotland and Duke of Châtellerault in France. His father's family descended from Walter FitzGilbert, the founder of the House of Hamilton, who had received the barony of Cadzow from Robert the Bruce in the 14th century.

George's mother was a daughter of George Seton, 7th Lord Seton. His parents had married in 1574 at Niddry Castle, West Lothian, Scotland. Both sides of the family were Scottish, Catholic, and supporters of Mary, Queen of Scots. His father and his father-in-law had both fought for her at Langside in 1568. George had four brothers and one sister, who are listed in his father's article.

First marriage 
Between 1602 and 1609 Hamilton married Isobel Leslie, his first wife. She was Scottish, the widow of Robert Lundie of Newhall in Fife. Their marriage date is constrained by her first husband's death in October 1602 and a document of 1609 that mentions her as Hamilton's wife. Isobel was the second daughter of James Leslie and his first wife, Margaret Lindsay. As her father predeceased her grandfather, Andrew Leslie, 5th Earl of Rothes, her father never succeeded to the earldom but was known by the courtesy title "Master of Rothes". The Leslies were Protestants, but her grandfather fought for the Queen at Langside. Neither of Isobel's marriages produced surviving children.

Plantation of Ulster 

The flight of the earls in 1607 cleared the way for the Plantation of Ulster. Like his elder brothers James and Claud, George was an undertaker in the plantation. In 1610 he received a "proportion" of land in the Strabane "precinct", which corresponds to the modern baronies of Strabane Lower and Strabane Upper. His eldest brother, James Hamilton, 1st Earl of Abercorn, was the chief undertaker in this precinct. By 1611 Hamilton had, according to the Carew Report, moved to Ireland and was living on his Irish lands with his wife and family. The report calls him a knight. When his elder brother Claud died in 1614, George took, in addition to his own, charge of Claud's proportions Eden (formerly called Teadane) and Killiny.

According to Nicholas Pynnar's survey in 1619, Hamilton owned Largie, a middle proportion (1,500 acres), and Derrywoon, a small proportion (1000 acres). Largie lay between the proportions Strabane and Donalong, which belonged to his eldest brother. Hamilton had built a stone house and bawn as well as a village on Largie. The modern villages of Artigarvan and Ballymagorry stand on it. There is a townland called Greenlaw next to Ballymagorry. Derrywoon lay further south on the lower River Derg. Hamilton had built a bawn as well as a village on it. Derrywoon includes the modern Baronscourt estate. Jointly with Sir William Stewart, Hamilton owned a middle proportion called Terremurearth, Tirenemurtagh, or Moynterlemy that had in 1611 belonged to a certain James Hayg.

Second marriage and child 
In 1630 Hamilton married as his second wife Mary Butler, 6th daughter of Walter Butler, 11th Earl of Ormond. The dowrie was fixed at £1,800. However, Ormond had difficulties to pay and it was agreed that Hamilton would enjoy the manor, castle, town, and lands of Roscrea for a duration of 21 years as a part payment of the dowry.

George and Mary had an only surviving child:

 James (died 1659), who never married

Roscrea attacked 
On 5 June 1646 Owen Roe O'Neil with the Confederate Ulster army defeated the Covenanters under Robert Monro. O'Neill then marched south to Kilkenny as directed by Rinuccini, the papal nuncio. Leinster and Munster was treated as enemy territory. On 17 September 1646, O'Neill attacked and captured Roscrea where Hamilton's family lived. The Ulstermen spared them but put everybody else to the sword. O'Neill then menaced Dublin in November 1646. Hamilton was probably employed elsewhere in the service of the Irish Catholic Confederation.

Death and timeline 
Hamilton died before 1657. He was survived by his son James who would, however, die unmarried in 1659.

Notes and references

Notes

Citations

Sources 

  – 1603 to 1624
 
  – 1643 to 1660
 
  – 1603–1623
 
  – 1625 to 1649
  – Ab-Adam to Basing
 
 
  – 1500 to 1611
  – (for timeline)
 
 
 
 
  – Viscounts
 
 
  – Abercorn to Balmerino (for Abercorn)
  – Fife to Hyndford (for Hamilton)
  – Panmure to Sinclair (for Rothes)
  – Sumerville to Winton (for Seton, earl of Winton)
  – 1643 to 1685
  – 1641 to 1643

17th-century Irish landowners
1650s deaths
Year of birth unknown
Year of death uncertain